Doris Sharp is the assumed title of a very early television series, which aired from 1931 to 1932 on New York City station W2XAB (now WCBS-TV).

Doris Sharp had a 15-minute segment on the station, in which she sang songs. The series did not air on a specific day of the week. It was listed in TV listings as simply Doris Sharp, songs, as W2XAB's schedule was arranged in the manner of a vaudeville program. For example, one episode aired on Monday August 31, 1931 at 8:45PM and was preceded by a "negro quartet" and followed by a fashion show. A different episode aired Thursday January 14, 1932 at 8:00PM and was the first program on the schedule, and was followed by "mixed quartet".

Nothing remains of the series today, as it aired live, and practical methods to record live television did not exist until late 1947.

Reception
The January 29 edition of the Brooklyn Daily Eagle features an article titled Success via Television. The article stated that "All last summer Doris sang on television. Lookers-in who heard and saw her said she sounded like a female Bing Crosby. They said she was great and should get somewhere". The article states that radio bandleader Harold Stern saw her performing on television and booked her to sing on nationwide radio with his orchestra.

See also
Other TV singers during the early 1930s included:
Harriet Lee
Helen Haynes
Grace Yeager
Elliot Jaffee
Alice Remsen

References

External links
Doris Sharp on IMDb

1931 American television series debuts
1932 American television series endings
1930s American television series
American live television series
Lost television shows
American music television series
Black-and-white American television shows
Local music television shows in the United States